Richland Township is one of twelve townships in Steuben County, Indiana, United States. As of the 2010 census, its population was 570 and it contained 187 housing units, making it the smallest township in the county.

Geography

Unincorporated towns
 Alvarado at 
(This list is based on USGS data and may include former settlements.)

Cemeteries
The township contains five cemeteries: Alvarado, Amish, Metz, Mount Pleasant, and Bethel.

Major highways
  Indiana State Road 427

History

The first land registration was made by John Douglas on October 11, 1835 but Robert Jackman and family were the first to settle in the township, in 1836.  The 1840 census shows only 16 families, including those of Douglas and Jackman.

Much of this early community was centered on what came to be the village of Richland Center, where a log cabin schoolhouse as well as a Methodist church were built in 1850.  When this village, which was never incorporated, organized a U. S. post office, there was already an Indiana post office named "Richland Center", so this post office was named "Alvardo", which eventually became the name for the village.  Like the rest of Richland township, Alvarado slowly lost population during the 20th century and, in the 21st century, is a small collection of dwellings, farm buildings, and the Alvarado United Methodist Church.

Notable native
Pop Buell, humanitarian aid worker in Laos in the 1960s and 1970s, was born in Richland Township and farmed there until he joined International Voluntary Services in 1960.

Notes and references

 Alvarado United Methodist Church, "History of the Alvarado United Methodist Church", accessed August 7, 2008.
 Imhof, Oscar (1956) "Richland Township", Harvey Morley, editor, The 1955 History, Complete County Atlas, pictorial and Biographical Album of Steuben County, Indiana, Angola, Indiana.
 Kelly, Niki (1996) "Our Towns: Alvarado", Fort Wayne Journal-Gazette, June 9, 1996.
"Steuben County Cemeteries", Steuben County, Indiana, INGenWeb Site, accessed August 12, 2008.
 U.S. Board on Geographic Names (GNIS)
 United States Census Bureau cartographic boundary files

External links
 Indiana Township Association
 United Township Association of Indiana

Townships in Steuben County, Indiana
Townships in Indiana